Fergus Scandal mac Crimthainn ("Fergus of the Disputes, son of Crimthann"; died AD 582)<ref>all dates per The Chronology of the Irish Annals, Daniel P. McCarthy</ref> was a king of Munster from the Eóganacht Airthir Cliach branch of the Eoganachta, the ruling dynasty of Munster. His nickname scandal means "quarrel, contention", from Latin scandalum. He was the son of Crimthann Dearcon mac Eochaid and great-grandson of Óengus mac Nad Froích (died 489) the first Christian king of Munster. This branch had their lands around Tipperary town.

He is mentioned in king lists such as the Laud Synchronisms and the Book of Leinster. According to the Annals of Tigernach, he succeeded Coirpre Cromm mac Crimthainn as king in 577 but was slain shortly thereafter in 582. This annal contradicts itself by stating that he ruled for seven years. According to Eogannacht sources, he was slain by the Leinstermen who forfeited Osraige to Munster as a blood-fine for this deed. Prof. Byrne dismisses this as later Osraige propaganda however

Notes

References

 Annals of Tigernach at CELT: Corpus of Electronic Texts at University College Cork
 Byrne, Francis John (2001), Irish Kings and High-Kings'', Dublin: Four Courts Press, 
Revised edition of McCarthy's sync

External links
CELT: Corpus of Electronic Texts at University College Cork

Kings of Munster
582 deaths
6th-century Irish monarchs
Year of birth unknown